Pauli Murray College is a residential college for undergraduates of Yale College in New Haven, Connecticut. The college, which opened to students in fall of 2017, was designed by Robert A. M. Stern Architects. It is named for Pauli Murray, an American civil and women's rights activist, Christian minister, and a 1965 graduate of Yale Law School.

The college's buildings reflect a modern revival of the Collegiate Gothic style. The college is located near Yale's Science Hill, Hillhouse Avenue, the Yale School of Management, and Grove Street Cemetery.

History 

In 2008, Yale University president Rick Levin announced that the college had the resources to educate more students and thus would expand its enrollment by opening two new residential colleges for a total of fourteen. Architectural models were unveiled by Robert A.M. Stern Architects in May 2009, featuring "a sampling of Gothic styles from across Yale’s campus," notably inspired by the early 20th-century buildings of James Gamble Rogers. Construction began in the fall of 2014, with an official groundbreaking ceremony in April 2015. In April 2016, the university announced that the colleges would be named after Pauli Murray and Benjamin Franklin.

Pauli Murray College is the northern of the two new colleges, referred to as "North College" in some earlier documents. When the colleges opened to students for the 2017–2018 academic year, they increased Yale's undergraduate capacity by 15 percent from 5,400 to 6,200 seats.

Tina Lu, Professor of East Asian Languages and Literature, is the first head of Pauli Murray College, and Alexander Rosas, the former associate director of Graduate Programs at Yale Law School, is its first dean.

The college's mascot is the lemur.

References

External links 

 

Residential colleges of Yale University
Robert A. M. Stern buildings